Glenn H. Stevens (born November 20, 1953) is an American mathematician and educator. He is Professor of Mathematics at Boston University where he has taught and conducted research since 1984.

Life
As a high school student, Stevens was a student of the Ross Program, an experience which would later lead him to found the PROMYS program along with fellow Ross alumni Marjory Baruch, David Fried, and Steve Rosenberg. Stevens earned his Ph.D. in Mathematics from Harvard University in 1981; his thesis advisor was Barry Mazur and the subject of his thesis was the special values of L-functions.

Work

Stevens’ research specialties are number theory, automorphic forms, and arithmetic geometry. He has authored or edited several books, including an exposition on Fermat's Last Theorem as well as a textbook about arithmetic on modular curves.

Awards and honors
A conference called Glennfest was held in honor of Stevens' 60th birthday on June 2–6, 2014. The theme of the conference was p-adic variation in number theory.

In 2015 he was elected as a fellow of the American Mathematical Society "for contributions to the theory of p-adic modular forms and for service to the mathematical community."

References

1953 births
Living people
20th-century American mathematicians
21st-century American mathematicians
Number theorists
Boston University faculty
Harvard University alumni
Fellows of the American Mathematical Society
People from Bakersfield, California
Mathematicians from California